Jacy Maranhão Oliveira (born 11 July 1997) is a Brazilian football midfielder who plays for FC Cascavel.

Club career

ViOn Zlaté Moravce
Jacy joined ViOn Zlaté Moravce on a one-year loan, in late August 2019.

Jacy made his professional Fortuna Liga debut for ViOn Zlaté Moravce against Nitra on 26 October 2019. He came on as a second-half substitute for Martin Kovaľ, who scored the only goal of the match, securing a narrow 1:0 win for the home side. For the upcoming five games, Jacy became a regular in ViOn's kit. 

He made a starting-XI debut against Pohronie, on 23 November 2019, during a 1:1 tie. He played the entire game and was booked with a yellow card, for a scuffle with Patrik Jacko. He repeated the starting line-up achievement against Ružomberok, in his final game for ViOn.

Jacy also made two Slovnaft Cup appearances against Slavoj Trebišov and Pohronie.

Overall, Jacy recorded 8 competitive starts for ViOn.

Pohronie
On 24 January 2020, ViOn had announced, prior to a friendly against Tatran Liptovský Mikuláš, that Jacy and Sílvio were free to take part in winter-break preparation with rivalling Pohronie. While Sílvio was unsuccessful with the club and ended up returning to his previous club, Jacy's signing was announced on 30 January 2020.

Jacy was first nominated for a Fortuna Liga fixture in a goal-less tie against Nitra at pod Zoborom on 15 February 2020. He did not appear in the match though. Neither did he appear in any fixtures for Pohronie and departed from the club at the end of his contract as an unnecessary player, on 30 June 2020, despite the fact that the season was not yet concluded, after the delay caused by the COVID-19 pandemic.

References

External links
 FK Pohronie official club profile 
 
 Jacy Maranhāo Oliveira at Futbalnet 
 

1997 births
Living people
Brazilian footballers
Brazilian expatriate footballers
Association football midfielders
Criciúma Esporte Clube players
Club Athletico Paranaense players
FC ViOn Zlaté Moravce players
FK Pohronie players
Rio Branco Sport Club players
Desportivo Brasil players
FC Cascavel players
Slovak Super Liga players
Campeonato Paranaense players
Campeonato Brasileiro Série B players
Campeonato Brasileiro Série D players
Brazilian expatriate sportspeople in Slovakia
Expatriate footballers in Slovakia
Pouso Alegre Futebol Clube players